Lagaffe mérite des baffes, written and drawn by Franquin, is the thirteenth album of the original Gaston Lagaffe series. It is made up of 46 strips previously published in Spirou.

Story
In this album, a struggle between Longtarin and Lagaffe begins. This theme will also be the occasion of most of the gags in the next album.

Inventions
parking meter: fake meter, so well imitated that drivers fill it
mini lawn ower: miniature lawn mower to avoid cutting daisies 
heating for motorbikes: suit linked to the radiator of the motorbike, and in which heated water flows, so that the motorcyclist is never cold; the only problem is that it lacks a regulator
electricity generator: thanks to a dynamo, a treadle lights a small lamp and allows the staff to deal with very urgent work in case of power failure
inflatable bag: bag to protect car occupants in case of accident, it goes off even in case of slight contact

Background
The first page of the album deals with the R5 album case. Prunelle announces that any #5 album will never be published.

References

 Gaston Lagaffe classic series on the official website
 Publication in Spirou on bdoubliées.com.

External links
Official website 

1979 graphic novels
Comics by André Franquin